Claudio Arrau León (February 6, 1903June 9, 1991) was a Chilean pianist known for his interpretations of a vast repertoire spanning the baroque to 20th-century composers, especially Bach, Beethoven, Schubert, Chopin, Schumann, Liszt and Brahms. He is widely considered one of the greatest pianists of the twentieth century.

Life
Arrau was born in Chillán, Chile to Carlos Arrau, an ophthalmologist who died when Claudio was only a year old, and Lucrecia León Bravo de Villalba, a piano teacher. He belonged to an old, prominent family of Southern Chile. His ancestor Lorenzo de Arrau, a Spanish engineer, was sent to Chile by King Carlos III of Spain. Through his great-grandmother, María del Carmen Daroch del Solar, Arrau was a descendant of the Campbells of Glenorchy, a Scottish noble family. Arrau was raised as a Catholic, but gave it up in his late teens.

Arrau was a child prodigy and he could read music before he could read words, but unlike many virtuosos, there had never been a professional musician in his family. His mother was an amateur pianist and introduced him to the instrument. At the age of 4 he was reading Beethoven sonatas, and he gave his first concert a year later. When Arrau was 6 he auditioned in front of several congressmen and President Pedro Montt, who was so impressed that he began arrangements for Arrau's future education. At age 8, Arrau was sent on a ten-year-long grant from the Chilean government to study in Germany, travelling with his mother and sister Lucrecia. He was admitted to the Stern Conservatory of Berlin where he eventually became a pupil of Martin Krause, who had studied under Franz Liszt. At the age of 11 Arrau could play Liszt's Transcendental Etudes, one of the most difficult works for piano, as well as Brahms's Paganini Variations. Arrau's first recordings were made on Aeolian Duo-Art player piano music rolls. Krause died in his fifth year of teaching Arrau, leaving the 15-year-old student devastated by the loss of his mentor; Arrau did not continue formal study after that point.

In 1935, Arrau gave a celebrated rendition of the entire keyboard works of Johann Sebastian Bach over 12 recitals. In 1936, Arrau gave a complete Mozart keyboard works over 5 recitals, and followed with the complete Schubert and Weber cycles. In 1938, for the first time, Arrau gave the complete Beethoven piano sonatas and concertos in Mexico City. Arrau repeated this several times in his lifetime, including in New York and London. He became one of the leading authorities on Beethoven in the 20th century.

In 1937, Arrau married mezzo-soprano Ruth Schneider (1908–1989), a German national. They had three children: Carmen (1938–2006), Mario (1940–1988) who fathered three sons Shawn(1968) Paycer(1969) Kip (1970) and Christopher (1959). In 1941 the Arrau family emigrated from Germany to the United States, eventually settling in Douglaston, Queens, New York, where Arrau spent his remaining years. He became a dual U.S.-Chilean citizen in 1979. On August 17, 1982, the first CD of classical music of history was released by the PolyGram record company, whose content consisted of waltzes by Chopin performed by Claudio Arrau.

Arrau died on June 9, 1991, one year before his first great granddaughter Kori was born to grandson Kip His remains were interred in his native city of Chillán, Chile.

Tone and approach to music

Arrau was an intellectual and a deeply reflective interpreter. He read widely while travelling, and he learned English, Italian, German, and French in addition to his native Spanish. He became familiar with Jung's psychology in his twenties.

Arrau's attitude toward music was very serious. He preached fidelity to the score, but also the use of imagination. Although he often played with slower and more deliberate tempi from his middle age onward, he had a reputation as a fabulous virtuoso earlier in his career, a reputation supported by recordings he made at this time, such as Balakirev's Islamey and Liszt's Paganini études. However, even late in his career, he often tended to play with less restraint in live concerts than in studio recordings.

Arrau was a man of remarkable fortitude; even towards the end of his life he invariably programmed very large, demanding concerts, including works such as Beethoven's Emperor Concerto and Brahms' Piano Concerto No. 1.

Contributions
Arrau was a frequent recital performer: from age 40 to 60 he averaged 120 concerts a season, with a very large repertoire. At one time or another, he performed the complete keyboard works of Bach, Mozart, Beethoven and Chopin; but also programmed such off-the-beaten-path composers as Alkan and Busoni and illuminated obscure corners of the Liszt repertoire. It has been estimated that Arrau's total repertoire would carry him through 76 recital evenings, not counting the 60-odd works with orchestra which he also knew.

Arrau recorded a considerable part of the piano music of Schumann, Chopin and Liszt. He edited the complete Beethoven piano sonatas for the Peters Urtext edition and recorded all of them on the Philips label in 1962–1966. He recorded almost all of them once again in 1984-1990 along with Mozart's complete piano sonatas. He is also famous for his recordings of Schubert, Brahms and Debussy. At the time of his death at age 88 in the midst of a European concert tour, Arrau was working on a recording of the complete works of Bach for keyboard, and was also preparing some pieces of Haydn, Mendelssohn, Reger and Busoni, and Boulez's third piano sonata.

On March 26, 2021, Pristine Classical released what it called "a sonic overhaul" of Arrau's "stunningly brilliant" 1942 RCA studio recording of Bach's Goldberg Variations, remastered from an issue in 1988, which had "sat in the vaults [of RCA] for 46 years."

Critics
Olin Downes, reviewing a recital of Mozart, Schumann, Ravel and Debussy works in The New York Times, described Claudio Arrau as "a pianist of most exceptional equipment, imagination and unfailing taste."
In 1963, according to various critics, he was a man with "no equal at the present time in point of technical stature and depth of musical imagination," "the No. 1 pianist of our time," a "pianistic titan," a "lion of the piano," or, if you like, a "neo-Liszt from the Tropic of Capricorn".
Daniel Barenboim said that Claudio Arrau had a particular sound with two aspects: first a thickness, full-bodied and orchestral, and second an utterly disembodied timbre, quite spellbinding. 
Sir Colin Davis said: "His sound is amazing, and it is entirely his own... no one else has it exactly that way. His devotion to Liszt is extraordinary. He ennobles that music in a way no one else in the world can." 
According to American critic Harold C. Schonberg, Arrau always put "a decidedly romantic piano tone in his interpretations". 
Karl Schumann, Germany's leading music critic, said in the Süddeutsche Zeitung on June 2, 1986: "Is it not Claudio Arrau who is the most musical and deeply serious piano phenomenon of our time?".
According to Joseph Horowitz: "His earliest recordings, extending into the forties, are his most mercurial, and are buffed with the glistening tonal refinements mentioned in his early New York reviews. His recorded performances of the following decade or so are more majestically placed; given room to maneuver, he is more likely to linger than to bolt. (...) Then, sometimes around 1960, the recordings document a different change. An emerging undercurrent of raw feeling not only dictates yet slower tempos and grander rubatos, but adds to the dignified architecture of Arrau's sound a steady projection of human frailty. (...) How did this change come about? (...) At the risk of resorting to cut-rate psychology, I am tempted to cite, as well, the event Arrau recalls as 'the greatest shock in my life": his mother's death in 1959. Perhaps mourning opened new emotional pathways. Perhaps the disappearance of a pervasive authority figure freed or emboldened him to make a more vulnerable statement in his art."
John von Rhein wrote in 1991 in the Chicago Tribune: "He was among the least flamboyant of pianists, avoiding virtuosic display as rigorously as some pianists seek it out; yet there was never any doubt of his virtuoso technique. He commanded a rich sonority, each chord superbly weighted, the fingerwork a model of finely chiseled clarity, the shape of each phrase deeply considered. Sometimes Mr. Arrau's penchant for slow tempos and emphasis on inner detail could seem fussy, depriving his performances of spontaneity and momentum. At his considerable best, however, he was among the most deeply satisfying interpreters of Mozart, Brahms, Schumann, Liszt, Chopin and particularly Beethoven, whose works held a position in his repertoire comparable to that of his great colleague, pianist Rudolf Serkin.

Honours

List of awards, recognitions and medals awarded to Claudio Arrau.
 1915-1918:
 1915: Prize Rudolph Ibach
 Gustav Holländer Medal
 Sachsen-Gothaische Medal
 1918: Stern Conservatory's Exceptional Honours Diploma in Piano
 1919-1920: Liszt Prize in Germany
 1924: Permanent Active Member of the Bach Society in Santiago de Chile)
 1927: Grand Prix of the Concours International des Pianistes (International Pianist Competition) from Geneva, Suiza. The jury was composed by Arthur Rubinstein, Joseph Pembauer, Ernest Schelling, Alfred Cortot and José Vianna da Motta.
 1941: Illustrious Son of Chillán
 1944: Gold Medal in Appreciation from the Chilean government
 1949: Favorite Son of Mexico
 1949: Honorary degree from the University of Chile
 1954: Honorary Member of the University of Chile's Faculty of Music
 1954: Illustrious Son of Santiago
 1958: Royal Philharmonic Society medal
 1959: Honorary Citizen from Santiago
 1959: Worthy Son of Chillán
 1959: Gold Medal and Honorary Citizen of Concepción
 1959: Honorary Member of the University of Concepción
 1965: Knight of the Order of Arts and Letters in France
 1970: The Cross of Merit of the Federal Republic of Germany
 1973: Citation by United Jewish Appeal for support and contribution in solidarity with the Jewish people
 1980: Hans von Bülow Medal by Berlin Philharmonic, Germany
 1982: Doctor of Humane Letters by University of Vermont, United States
 1983: La Orden del Águila Azteca (The Order of the Aztec Eagle) in Mexico
 1983: Honorary Member of the Pan American Society
 1983: The Philadelphia's bowl, United States
 1983: First Honorary Member of the Düsseldorf, Germany Robert Schumann Society
 1983: Commander of the Legion of Honor in France
 1983: The International Music Award by UNESCO
 1983: Commander of the National Academy of Santa Cecilia
 1983: Beethoven's medal in New York City
 1983: Honorary degree from the University of Oxford, England
 1983: National Prize of Musical Arts of Chile
 1984: Honorary degree from the University of Concepción
 1984: Honorary degree from the University from Bío-Bío
 1984: Honorary Member from Academy of Fine Arts of Chile
 1984: Highest Distinction Award from the Inter-American Music Council and the Organization of American States
 1986: Freedom Award from the Mayor of the New York City
 1988: The Teresa Carreño Medal in Venezuela
 1988: Honorary Member of the Royal Philharmonic Society of London
 1990: Gold Medal from the Royal Philharmonic Society of London (posthumously delivered to his daughter Carmen)
 1991: Unfinished Arrau performance with his Robert Schumann Medal at a recital scheduled for June 1991 in Düsseldorf, Germany.
 1991: The Robert Schumann Society established the Arrau Medal in 1991. The medal is awarded to a pianist who is especially committed to the spirit and tradition of Claudio Arrau's keyboard art. Examples include András Schiff, Martha Argerich and Murray Perahia.
 1991: Cultural Medal known as Citizen of the World, awarded by the Palacio de la Moneda de Chile.
 2012: Entry into the Gramophone Hall of Fame

Partial discography
 Beethoven, Conc. pf. n. 4, 5 - Arrau/Haitink/CGO, 1964 Philips
 Beethoven, Piano Concertos Nos. 4 & 5 - Claudio Arrau/Sir Colin Davis/Staatskapelle Dresden, Philips
 Beethoven, The 5 Piano Concertos - Claudio Arrau/Sir Colin Davis/Staatskapelle Dresden, 1988 Philips
 Beethoven, Sonatas. pf. n. 1-32 - Arrau, 1964 Decca
 Beethoven, Sonatas. pf. n. 8, 14, 23 - Arrau, 1962/1967 Decca
 Beethoven: The Late Piano Sonatas, Op. 101, 106, 109, 110, & 111 - Claudio Arrau, Philips
 Beethoven: Complete Piano Sonatas - Claudio Arrau, Decca
 Chopin, Ballate n. 1-4/Scherzi n. 1-4 - Arrau, 1977/1984 Decca
 Chopin, Claudio Arrau Plays Chopin - Arrau/Inbal/LPO, Decca
 Chopin, Conc. pf. n. 1-2/Krakowiak - Arrau/Inbal/LPO, 1970/1980 Philips
 Chopin, Nocturnes n. 1-21 - Arrau, 1978/1980 Philips
 Chopin, Valzer n. 1-19 - Arrau, 1980 Decca
 Chopin, 26 Preludes & 4 Impromptus - Claudio Arrau, Philips
 Chopin: Études Op. 10 and Op. 25 - Claudio Arrau, 1957 EMI Great Recordings of the Century 
 Debussy: Preludes & Images & Estampes - Claudio Arrau, 1991 Philips
 Liszt, 12 Etudes d'exécution transcendante - Claudio Arrau, 1977 Philips
 Liszt: Sonata in B Minor, 2 Études de concert - Claudio Arrau, Philips
 Mozart, Son. pf. n. 1-18/Fant./Rondò - Arrau, 1973/1987 Decca
 Schubert: Late Piano Sonatas - Claudio Arrau, Decca
 Schumann: Carnaval; Kinderszenen; Waldszenen - Claudio Arrau, 1987 Philips
 Arrau, Beethoven/Chopin/Liszt - Davis/LSO, 1976/1985 Decca
 Arrau, The legacy - Bach/Beethoven/Schubert/Debussy, 1988/1991 Decca

Filmography

Books 
 1984: Leben mit der Musik (with Joseph Horowitz)
 1985: Arrau parle: conversations avec Joseph Horowitz (with Joseph Horowitz)
 2009: Liszt: A Listener's Guide to His Piano Works (with John Bell Young)

References

External links

 ArrauHouse. Comprehensive website on Claudio Arrau
 Arrau site français Claudio Arrau: Discographie, repertoire et informations.
 Biographical sketch for Claudio Arrau
  from Unitel
 Decca & Philips' Biography and Discography of Claudio Arrau
 Marston Records' Biography of Claudio Arrau
 Biography of Claudio Arrau from Answers.com
 Arrau's comprehensive discography 
  
 Biography of Claudio Arrau 
 Article of Claudio Arrau from Encyclopædia Britannica Online
 
 Arrau's Museum
 
 Piano Lessons with Claudio Arrau: A Guide to His Philosophy and Techniques by Victoria A. von Arx

1903 births
1991 deaths
People from Chillán
Chilean people of Catalan descent
Chilean classical pianists
American classical pianists
Male classical pianists
American male pianists
Chilean emigrants to the United States
Royal Philharmonic Society Gold Medallists
Chevaliers of the Ordre des Arts et des Lettres
Berlin University of the Arts alumni
Honorary Members of the Royal Philharmonic Society
Commanders Crosses of the Order of Merit of the Federal Republic of Germany
Commandeurs of the Légion d'honneur
20th-century classical pianists
20th-century American pianists
20th-century American male musicians